Bodo Löttgen (born 5 May 1959) is a German police officer and politician of the Christian Democratic Union (CDU) who has served as a member of the State Parliament of North Rhine-Westphalia from 2005 to 2012 and again since 2017. He has been chairing his party’s parliamentary group since 2017.

Early life and career
Löttgen was born 1959 in the West German village of Elsenroth and studied applied administrative science and became a high-ranking police officer.

Political career
Löttgen was first elected directly to the State Parliament of North Rhine-Westphalia in the 2005 elections.

In the negotiations to form a coalition government under the leadership of Minister-President of North Rhine-Westphalia Hendrik Wüst following the 2022 state elections, Löttgen was part of his party’s delegation.

Other activities
 Borussia Dortmund, Member of the Supervisory Board (since 2019)

References 

1959 births
Living people
Members of the Landtag of North Rhine-Westphalia
Christian Democratic Union of Germany politicians